Allu (also Romanized as Āllū; also known as Ahl) is a village in Qeshlaq Rural District, in the Central District of Ahar County, East Azerbaijan Province, Iran. At the 2006 census, its population was 736, in 170 families.

References 

Populated places in Ahar County